Beugnon-Thireuil is a commune in the Deux-Sèvres department in the Nouvelle-Aquitaine region in western France. It is the result of the merger, on 1 January 2019, of the communes of Le Beugnon and La Chapelle-Thireuil.

See also
Communes of the Deux-Sèvres department

References

Communes of Deux-Sèvres
Populated places established in 2019
2019 establishments in France